Robert Hunter (1666–1734) was a British military officer, colonial governor of New York and New Jersey from 1710 to 1720, and governor of Jamaica from 1727 to 1734.

Biography
Hunter was born in Edinburgh, Scotland in 1666, grandson of the twentieth Laird of Hunterston in Ayrshire, being the son of lawyer James Hunter and his wife Margaret Spalding.

Hunter had been apprenticed to an apothecary before running away to join the British Army. He became an officer in 1689 who rose to become a general, and married a woman of high rank. He was a man of business whose first address to the New Jersey Assembly was barely 300 words long. In it, he stated, "If honesty is the best policy, plainness must be the best oratory."

He was appointed Lieutenant Governor of Virginia in 1707, but was captured by a corsair on his way to Virginia, taken to France, and in 1709 exchanged for the French Bishop of Quebec. He was then appointed Governor of New York and sailed to America with 3,000 Palatine refugees as settlers in 1710. In 1715 he advocated the local minting of copper coins, but the king refused. Governor Hunter's philosophy was that "the true Interests of the People and Government are the same, I mean A Government of Laws. No other deserves the Name, and are never Separated or Separable but in Imagination by Men of Craft."

Hunter was succeeded as Governor by Pieter Schuyler as acting governor from 1719 to 1720 and finally by William Burnet, whose post as Comptroller of Customs was given to Hunter in exchange. Hunter was then Governor of Jamaica from 1727 until his death on 31 March 1734. While in Jamaica, Hunter waged an unsuccessful war against the Jamaican Maroons.

He was a member of the Society for the Propagation of the Gospel. He was elected a Fellow of the Royal Society in May 1709.

Playwriting
His play, Androboros, written in 1714, was the first known play to be written and published in the North American British Colonies.

See also
List of colonial governors of New Jersey
List of colonial governors of New York
Androboros

References

Further reading

External links
 Biography of Robert Hunter, New Jersey State Library
 Colonial Governors of New York
 Robert Hunter Papers, 1699-1744 New-York Historical Society

1666 births
1734 deaths
Military personnel from Edinburgh
Governors of the Province of New York
Colonial governors of New Jersey
Colonial governors of Virginia
Governors of Jamaica
British Army generals
Fellows of the Royal Society
Scottish dramatists and playwrights
British Army personnel of the War of the Spanish Succession
Civil servants from Edinburgh